HD 154972, also known as HR 6373 or rarely 56 G. Apodis, is a solitary, bluish-white-hued star located in the southern circumpolar constellation Apus. It has an apparent magnitude of 6.23, placing it near the limit for naked eye visibility. At its current distance, HD 154972's brightness is diminished by 0.23 magnitudes due to extinction from interstellar dust. It has an absolute magnitude of +1.11.

This is an ordinary A-type main-sequence star with a stellar classification of A0 V. Paunzen et al. (2001) lists it as a potential λ Boötis star. It has 2.56 times the mass of the Sun and 2.08 times its solar radius. It is estimated to be 330 million years old and is slightly metal deficient (78% solar abundance).

References

Apus (constellation)
A-type main-sequence stars
154972
084510
CD-74 01187
6373
Apodis, 56
High-proper-motion stars